Ipolito Fenukitau (born 22 July 1972) is a Tongan rugby union footballer. He has played over 10 times for the Tonga national rugby union team, including representing them at the 1995 Rugby World Cup in South Africa and 2003 Rugby World Cup in Australia. His usual position is at flanker.

Fenukitau made his debut for Tonga on 5 June 1993 in a match against a non-cap Scottish XV, in which he featured in the starting lineup. He played in three other matches that year; against Fiji, Australia and again against Fiji. In 1995 he played in two Tests against Japan, and was then included in the 1995 Rugby World Cup squad for South Africa, playing in two games against France and Scotland.

In 1998 he played for the Australian sevens team at the Commonwealth Games.

In 2002 he played two Tests for Tonga; against Fiji and Samoa, and the following year he was included in the 2003 Rugby World Cup squad for Australia, playing in all four pool games for Tonga.

References

External links
 Ipolito Fenukitau on rwc2003.irb.com
 

1972 births
Living people
Rugby union flankers
Tongan rugby union players
Tonga international rugby union players
Tongan expatriate rugby union players
Expatriate rugby union players in Australia
Tongan expatriate sportspeople in Australia
Tongan expatriate sportspeople in Japan
Black Rams Tokyo players
Australia international rugby sevens players
Male rugby sevens players
Commonwealth Games medallists in rugby sevens
Rugby sevens players at the 1998 Commonwealth Games
Commonwealth Games bronze medallists for Australia
Commonwealth Games rugby sevens players of Australia
Medallists at the 1998 Commonwealth Games